St. Moritz is a high Alpine resort town in the Engadine in Switzerland, at an elevation of about  above sea level. It is Upper Engadine's major town and a municipality in the district of Maloja in the Swiss canton of Graubünden.

St. Moritz lies on the southern slopes of the Albula Alps below the Piz Nair overlooking the flat and wide glaciated valley of the Upper Engadine and eponymous lake: Lake St. Moritz. It hosted the Winter Olympics in 1928 and 1948.

History

Votive offerings, swords, and needles from the Bronze Age found at the base of the springs in St. Moritz indicate that the Celts had already discovered them. St. Moritz is first mentioned around 1137–39 as ad sanctum Mauricium. The village was named after Saint Maurice, an early Christian saint from southern Egypt said to have been martyred in the 3rd century by Maximian in Switzerland while serving as leader of the Theban Legion.

Pilgrims traveled to Saint Mauritius, often to the church of the springs, where they drank from the blessed, bubbling waters of the Mauritius springs in the hopes of being healed. In 1519, the Medici pope Leo X promised full absolution to anyone making a pilgrimage to the church of the springs. In the 16th century, the first scientific treatises about the St. Moritz mineral springs were written. In 1535, Paracelsus, the great practitioner of natural remedies, spent some time in St. Moritz. 

Although it received some visitors during the summer, the origins of the winter resort only date back  to September 1864, when St. Moritz hotel pioneer Caspar Badrutt made a wager with four British summer guests: they should return in winter and, if the village was not to their liking, then he would reimburse their travel costs. If they were to find St. Moritz attractive in winter, then he would invite them to stay as his guests for as long as they wished. This marked not only the start of winter tourism in St. Moritz but also the start of winter tourism in the whole of the Alps. The first tourist office in Switzerland was established the same year in the village. St. Moritz developed rapidly in the late nineteenth century; the first electric light in Switzerland was installed in 1878 at the Kulm Hotel, and the first curling tournament on the continent was held in 1880. The first European Ice-Skating Championships were held at St. Moritz in 1882 and first golf tournament in the Alps held in 1889. The first bob run and bob race was held in 1890. By 1896, St. Moritz became the first village in the Alps to install electric trams and opened the Palace Hotel. A horse race was held on snow in 1906, and on the frozen lake the following year. The first ski school in Switzerland was established in St. Moritz in 1929.

St. Moritz hosted the 1928 Winter Olympics—the stadium still stands today—and again in 1948. It has hosted over 20 FIBT World Championships, four FIS Alpine World Ski Championships (1934/1974/2003/2017) and over 40 Engadin Skimarathons since 1969. It has also hosted many other events since, including some unlikely ones on the frozen lake in the 1970s and 1980s such as a golf tournament, (1979), a snow polo tournament (held every year in January since 1985) and Cricket on Ice (1989). St. Moritz has also been the venue for many Sailing and Windsurfing World Championships.

Since the early 1980s St. Moritz is also promoted and known as Top of the World. The expression was registered as a trademark by the tourist office in 1987.

Geography

Of this area, about 26.3% is used for agricultural purposes, while 20.0% is forested. Of the rest of the land, 9.0% is settled (buildings or roads) and 44.8% is unproductive land. Of the agricultural land  is fields and grasslands, and  consists of alpine grazing areas. Rivers and lakes cover  in the municipality.

Before 2017, the municipality was located in the Oberengadin sub-district of the Maloja district, after 2017 it was part of the Maloja Region.

Sport

St. Moritz has been a resort for winter sport vacations since the 19th century. Students from Oxford and Cambridge went there to play each other; the predecessor of the recurring Ice Hockey Varsity Match was a bandy match played in St. Moritz in 1885.
St. Moritz was the host city for the Winter Olympic Games in 1928 and 1948, one of three cities to host twice, along with Innsbruck, Austria, and Lake Placid in the United States. It also hosted the FIS Alpine World Ski Championships in 1934, 1974, 2003, and 2017.

Additionally, St. Moritz has hosted the FIBT World Championships (bobsleigh and skeleton racing) a record 21 times. Since 1985, it has hosted Snow Polo St. Moritz, a tournament featuring many of the world's finest team and played on a specially marked field on the frozen lake.

St. Moritz is extremely popular in the summer months as an altitude training base for distance athletes, particularly cyclists, runners, and race walkers. Its popularity extends to the altitude, weather, world class athletics track, and availability of paths and trails in the area.

In 1904, the oldest and world's last remaining natural bob run was opened. The  ice channel – also known as the world's biggest  is built every winter from the ground up with only snow and water. The bob run hosted numerous world championships and was used in both Olympic Winter Games. In the early 1930s, some members of the bob club started taking guests along for taxi rides; today they run with slightly modified racing bobs.

For the 1928 games, the cross-country skiing and the cross-country skiing part of the Nordic combined events took place around the hills of St. Moritz. Twenty years later, once again the cross-country skiing, the cross-country skiing part of the Nordic combined, and the ice hockey events took place in St. Moritz.

In addition to the above sports, St. Moritz is also well known as a destination for sailing. It is the host venue for the annual St. Moritz Match Race held on lake St. Moritz. The St. Moritz Match Race event is part of the prestigious World Match Racing Tour which covers three continents. The identical supplied (BLU-26) boats are raced two at a time in an on the water dogfight which tests the sailors and skippers to the limits of their physical abilities. Points accrued count towards the World Match Racing Tour and a place in the final event, with the overall winner taking the title ISAF World Match Racing Tour Champion.

Tourism

Thanks to its favorable location, St. Moritz enjoys over 300 days of sunshine a year. Every winter it hosts the "White Turf" horse race on the frozen Lake St. Moritz attended by the international upper class. Prominent property owners in St. Moritz included Sonja Ziemann, Gunter Sachs, Herbert von Karajan, Lakshmi Mittal, Ivan Glasenberg, Mohammad Reza Pahlavi, Ingvar Kamprad, Helmut Horten, Giovanni Agnelli, Aristoteles Onassis and Stavros Niarchos. 

Popular pastimes include skiing, snowboarding, and hiking, and nearby there is also the world-famous Cresta Run toboggan course.

The year-round population is 5,600, with some 3,000 seasonal employees supporting hotels and rental units with a total of 13,000 beds. The Kulm Hotel St. Moritz is a large luxury hotel in St. Moritz.

Main sights

The Segantini Museum: dedicated to Giovanni Segantini, a painter that lived the last five years of his life in Engadine. The Segantini Museum is listed as a Swiss heritage site of national significance.
The bobsled run: a very rare all-natural venue, typically open by mid-December
Viewing the glacier landscape: there are a number of notable vistas. Much can be seen by descending from Diavolezza to the Morteratsch Glacier.
The  Piz Corvatsch with its ice cave and its lengthy  piste down to St. Moritz-Bad.

Climate
St. Moritz has a subarctic climate (Köppen: Dfc) due to its particularly high elevation near to the tree line. The average temperature, about 2°C (36°F; measured in the nearby town of Samedan), is extremely low compared to that of the Swiss Plateau. It is also significantly lower to that of La Brévine, traditionally considered the coldest inhabited place in Switzerland.

Demographics

Population
, 38.0% of the population was made up of foreign nationals. Over the 10 years up to 2009 the population decreased at a rate of 4.9%.

, the gender distribution of the population was 45.4% male and 54.6% female. The age distribution, in St. Moritz is; 423 children or 7.6% of the population are between 0 and 9 years old and 502 teenagers or 9.0% are between 10 and 19. Of the adult population, 960 people or 17.2% of the population are between 20 and 29 years old. 1,055 people or 18.9% are between 30 and 39, 864 people or 15.5% are between 40 and 49, and 820 people or 14.7% are between 50 and 59. The senior population distribution is 532 people or 9.5% of the population are between 60 and 69 years old, 289 people or 5.2% are between 70 and 79, there are 121 people or 2.2% who are between 80 and 89, and there are 23 people or 0.4% who are 90 and older.

In 2014 there were 2,822 private households in St. Moritz with an average household size of 1.84 persons.  Of the 884 inhabited buildings in the municipality, in 2000, about 29.1% were single family homes and 40.8% were multiple family buildings.  Additionally, about 19.9% of the buildings were built before 1919, while 8.6% were built between 1991 and 2000.  In 2013 the rate of construction of new housing units per 1000 residents was 9.32.  The vacancy rate for the municipality, was 3.18%.

Politics
In the 2015 federal election the most popular party was the FDP with 31.0% of the vote.  The next three most popular parties were the SVP (27.0%), the BDP (15.1%) and the CVP (11.0%).  In the federal election, a total of 1,428 votes were cast, and the voter turnout was 54.1%.

In the 2007 federal election the most popular party was the SVP which received 34.9% of the vote. The next three most popular parties were the FDP (24.5%), the SP (22.4%), and the CVP (17%).

Education
In St. Moritz about 65.8% of the population (between age 25-64) have completed either non-mandatory upper secondary education or additional higher education (either university or a Fachhochschule).

Employment
St. Moritz is a regional economic centre and a tourist community.  , there were a total of 7,590 people employed in the municipality.  Of these, a total of 24 people worked in 7 businesses in the primary economic sector.  The secondary sector employed 1,039 workers in 74 separate businesses.  A minority (17.0%) of the secondary sector employees worked in very small businesses.  There were 22 small businesses with a total of 533 employees and 3 mid sized businesses with a total of 329 employees.  Finally, the tertiary sector provided 6,527 jobs in 768 businesses.  In 2014 a total of 3,820 employees worked in 752 small companies (less than 50 employees).  There were 14 mid sized businesses with 1,928 employees and 2 large businesses which employed 779 people (for an average size of 389.5).  The Badrutt's Palace Hotel (Five Star) has a staff of 520 persons and is the biggest employer in St. Moritz.

In 2014 a total of 9.3% of the population received social assistance.

In the second quarter of 2016 an average of 1,062 workers commuted from outside Switzerland to work in the municipality, representing a minority of the employees.

In 2015 local hotels had a total of 599,734 overnight stays, of which 69.2% were international visitors.  In the same year there was one movie theater in the municipality with 267 seats.

Languages
Most of the population speaks German (58.8%), with Italian being second most common (21.8%), and Portuguese being third (6.6%).  Originally, the entire population spoke the Upper-Engadin Romansh dialect of Puter. Due to increasing trade with the outside world, Romansh usage began to decline. In 1880, only 50.2% spoke Romansh as a first language. Romansh lost ground to both German and Italian. In 1900, 31% of the population spoke Italian as a first language, and in 1910, it was about the same. In the following years, the percentage of Romansh and Italian speakers both decreased against German speakers. In 1941, only 20% spoke Romansh, and in 1970 it was 8%. In 2000, only 4.7% of the population spoke Romansh.

Transportation

St. Moritz is the highest town in the country with a railway station. St. Moritz railway station is situated in the centre of the town, near the lakeshore and at the bottom of Via Serlas. It is operated by the Rhaetian Railway, and is the terminus for Albula and Bernina railway lines. The Glacier Express and Bernina Express trains stop at St. Moritz.

Near the railway station is an important Swiss PostBus stop.

The St. Moritz–Corviglia funicular links St. Moritz with the Corviglia summit and ski area.

In popular culture

Featured in the opening scenes of The Man Who Knew Too Much, a 1934 thriller directed by Alfred Hitchcock.
Mentioned in James Bond films: Goldfinger of 1964 and For Your Eyes Only in 1981.
Ski scenes from James Bond movies The Spy Who Loved Me and A View to a Kill were filmed at St. Moritz although attributed to other locations in the dialogue.
Mentioned in the 1969 Peter Sarstedt hit "Where Do You Go To (My Lovely)?," describing a Euro jet-setter who flies to St. Moritz.
Mentioned in the popular 1990 romantic thriller novel Memories of Midnight, by Sidney Sheldon, as a ski-resort where the characters of Catherine Alexander and Kirk Reynolds go for vacation.
Location of Kars' hideout in JoJo's Bizarre Adventure Part 2: Battle Tendency.
Mentioned in the 2004 film, The Prince and Me.
Shown in an episode of Smallville; where Lois Lane's sister is running from the mob.
Shown in a first-season episode of Cheap Seats. The Sklar brothers riff an episode of Wide World of Sports from the 1960s which showcased horse racing on a frozen Lake St. Moritz.
Mentioned in the 1990 novel, Public Secrets, by Nora Roberts, as a vacation getaway for character Emma McAvoy.
 Included in the list of ski resorts in the refrain from the Global Deejays remix of the Sound of San Francisco (Snow Radio) version: "Kitzbühel, Schladming, Ischgl, St. Anton, Zillertal, Seiser Alm, Kaprun, Aspen, Semmering, St. Moritz, Cortina, St. Johann, Mount Everest, Rocky Mountains".
 Part of the Netflix movie Army of Thieves.
The place where Maurizio Gucci hides from the Italian police, and meets Paola Franchi, his future girlfriend (2021 movie House of Gucci, 2001 book The House of Gucci: A Sensational Story of Murder, Madness, Glamour, and Greed, but also real-life events).
Setting of the 2022 video game Pentiment

Notable people 
 Stavros Niarchos (1909–1996), Greek magnate; lived in St. Moritz
 Bibi Torriani (1911–1988), Swiss ice hockey player and coach, IIHF Hall of Fame inductee
 Lieutenant Colonel Digby Willoughby MC MBE (1934–2007), soldier and sportsman, chief executive of the St. Moritz Tobogganing Club from 1978
 Günter Traub (born 1939), German speed skater; lives in St. Moritz
 Gian Franco Kasper (1944 in St. Moritz – 2021) a Swiss ski official and president of the International Ski Federation (FIS) from 1998 to 2021
 Clifton Wrottesley (born 1968), Irish sportsman and British peer; lives in St. Moritz
 Thomas Flohr (born 1969/1970), Swiss billionaire businessman, founder and chairman of VistaJet; lives in St. Moritz

See also
Hotel St. Moritz in New York, named after the village
Niseko, Hokkaido is well known as "oriental St. Moritz"

Notes

References

External links

St. Moritz Tourism

 
Venues of the 1928 Winter Olympics
1940 Winter Olympics
Venues of the 1948 Winter Olympics
Cultural property of national significance in Graubünden
Lakeside resorts in Switzerland
Olympic cross-country skiing venues
Olympic ice hockey venues
Olympic Nordic combined venues
Populated places on the Inn (river)
Ski areas and resorts in Switzerland
Spa towns in Switzerland
Venues of the 2020 Winter Youth Olympics